Karen A. Thole (born July 11, 1960) is an American engineer. She is a Distinguished Professor and former head of the Department of Mechanical Engineering at Pennsylvania State University.

Early life and education
Thole was born on July 11, 1960, in Breese, Illinois to an army veteran father. She was raised on a dairy farm and by fifth grade was driving a tractor around the field. She graduated from Central Community High School and enrolled at Eastern Illinois University for two years before transferring to the University of Illinois Urbana-Champaign. Following the transfer, she earned her Bachelor of Science degree and Master's degree in Mechanical Engineering at the University of Illinois and her PhD in the same subject at the University of Texas at Austin. During her undergraduate career, she received the University of Illinois' Caterpillar Scholarship.

Career
Following her PhD, Thole spent one year as a post-doctoral researcher at the Institute for Thermal Turbomachinery at the Karlsruhe Institute of Technology in Germany. She soon returned to North America and accepted an assistant professor position at the University of Wisconsin–Madison (UWM). During her short tenure at UWM, Thole received a 1996 National Science Foundation CAREER Award. Thole left UWM in 1999 to join the faculty at Virginia Tech, where her husband Michael Alley also worked. While there, she focused on heat transfer and fluid mechanics while specializing in turbulent boundary layers, convective heat transfer, and high freestream turbulence effects. As a result of her research success, Thole became the first woman at Virginia Tech to be awarded an endowed engineering professorship in 2005.

Shortly following her promotion, Thole left Virginia Tech to become the head of the Department of Mechanical and Nuclear Engineering at Pennsylvania State University (Penn State) in July 2006. In this role, she advocated, recruited, and retained girls and women in science, technology, engineering, and math fields. As such, she was honored by the White House as a "Champion of Change" in 2011. Thole also established the Steady Thermal Aero Research Turbine Laboratory (START) which was "focused on gas turbine heat transfer during continuous operation at realistic engine conditions." A few years later, Thole was also named the Society of Women Engineers’ 2014 Distinguished Engineering Educator.

During her tenure at Penn State, Thole established the Engineering Ambassadors Network, a program that provided undergraduate students with professional skills. As such, she received the 2016 Edwin F. Church Medal from the American Society of Mechanical Engineers (ASME). She also made significant technical contributions in "pioneering new cooling strategies for airfoils in gas turbine engines, which allows for higher operating temperatures and reduced fuel consumption." Thole then collaborated with other engineers to find ways to reduce carbon dioxide emissions from turbines. As a result of her research, Thole testified in front of the United States Congress. In 2017, Thole was appointed a Penn State Distinguished Professor and appointed to American Society of Mechanical Engineers Board of Governors. She also received the 2017 Claire L. Felbinger Award for Diversity for "extraordinary success in achieving or facilitating diversity and inclusiveness in the technological segments of our society."

In 2019, John J. Brennan established the Professor Karen A. Thole Annual Scholarship for Diversity in Engineering. Thole was also awarded the Air Breathing Propulsion Award from the American Institute of Aeronautics and Astronautics. In 2021 she stepped down as department chair, and was succeeded by Mary Frecker.

References

External links

1960 births
Living people
American mechanical engineers
Pennsylvania State University faculty
Virginia Tech faculty
University of Wisconsin–Madison faculty
Grainger College of Engineering alumni
Cockrell School of Engineering alumni